Stéphen-Charles Chauvet (1885–1950), commonly known as Dr Stéphen Chauvet, was the author of the first illustrated book about Easter Island, L'Île de Pâques et ses mystères, published in Paris in 1935.

Chauvet never traveled to Easter Island; he derived much of his information from sources of mixed reliability. However, his book remains an important work, in particular, because of its many illustrations, some of which show objects that no longer exist.

The French version of the book has never been republished.  A Spanish translation, "La isla de Pascua y sus misterios" was published in Santiago, Chile, in 1946 and reprinted in 1970. An English translation has also been published.

See also 
History of Easter Island

References

External links
L'île de Pâques et ses mystères (2004 on-line translation by Ann Altman, with all illustrations and additional biographical material on Chauvet)

1885 births
1950 deaths
French male writers
20th-century French male writers